Phyllonorycter alni is a moth of the family Gracillariidae. It is known Colorado and Maine in the United States.

The wingspan is about 5.5 mm.

The larvae feed on Alnus species, including Alnus tenuifolia. They mine the leaves of their host plant. The mine has the form of a large tentiform mine on the underside of the leaf.

References

alni
Moths of North America
Moths described in 1891